Okresní přebor (District League in English) is a Czech sport comedy television series created by Jan Prušinovský that airs on TV Nova. The series premiered on 6 September 2010.

Plot 
Stories revolving around the small SJ Slavoj Houslice football team in the fictitious Czech village of Houslice.

Production 
Filming started in February 2009 in the village of Lochovice.

Because of the series' excellent ratings, in 2011 TV Nova decide to shoot a feature-length film based on the series.

Cast and characters

Main 
 Ondřej Vetchý as Jirka Luňák  Jiřina
 David Novotný as Jarda Kužel
 Luděk Sobota as Václav Orel
 Leoš Noha as Adolf Větvička a.k.a. Áda
 Pavel Kikinčuk as Ludvík Hovorka a.k.a. Ludva
 Jaroslava Pokorná as Antonie Hnátková
 Tatiana Vilhelmová as Ilona
 Pavel Nečas - as Luboš Matějka

Recurring 
 Ladislav Hampl as Jarmil Hubáček
 Martin Bao as Fun Din Dung

Episodes

Ratings 
The first episode got a high rating of 1,600,000 viewers and a 53.27% share.

References

External links 
 Official page
 

TV Nova (Czech TV channel) original programming
Czech comedy television series
2010 Czech television series debuts
Czech sports television series